City Club are a Bangladeshi cricket team that plays List A cricket in the Dhaka Premier Division Cricket League. They are based in Mirpur.

City Club were promoted to List A status for the first time for the 2021–22 tournament, along with Rupganj Tigers Cricket Club. They played their first match against Prime Bank Cricket Club on 15 March 2022, losing by 50 runs; seven of the team, including the captain, Jawad Royen, were playing their first List A match. Their first victory came on 3 April in their sixth match, when they beat Khelaghar Samaj Kallyan Samity by one wicket with one ball to spare.

List A record
 2021-22: 11 matches, won 4, finished tenth

Records
City Club's highest List A score is 114 by Zakirul Ahmed in 2021-22, and the best bowling figures are 4 for 61 by Usman Khalid in 2021-22.

References

External links
 City Club at CricketArchive

Dhaka Premier Division Cricket League teams